Jeanne Devereaux (1912-2011) was an American prima ballerina, starting as a child star at age 11 and continuing for the next four decades.

Born Jean Eleanor Helman, she performed as Jeanne Devereaux, taking the last name of her grandmother, Jeanette (Devereaux) Lane.  She was a headliner at Radio City Music Hall, performing on Broadway and the burlesque circuit, and danced on stages around the world.  During her career she gave 6,000 paid performances, as well as 500 free benefit performances.

She was the sole support for her mother, who traveled with her and managed her career, with financial ups and downs that included numerous periods between bookings of being nearly destitute.  They often had to live with her grandparents in Pasadena, California for months at a time.  In October 1935, she performed in front of King George V and Queen Mary at a Royal Command Performance at the London Palladium.  No other American prima ballerina before had been asked to perform at such a prestigious event.  She performed with various civic light opera companies across the United States, and in World War II, did USO tours.

In the 1930-31, she made two motion pictures, one a Fox musical comedy called “Are You There?” and the other a Warner Bros. picture called “Kiss Me Again.”  On May 17, 1949, she performed on Milton Berle’s television show, "Texaco Star Theater."

In 1952, she married engineer Thomas Gardiner Perkins, which finally brought financial security to her life.  She opened the Devereaux Ballet Arts School in Pasadena, California, initially in their home and later in a studio (due to zoning restrictions).  The two of them also operated a business designing and building museum display cases.  She became a popular lecturer on historical topics and conducted extensive research at the Huntington Library on Grace Nicholson, whose home is now the USC Pacific Asia Museum.  She died peacefully in 2011, just shy of 100 years old, one of the last living vaudevillians.

References

1912 births
2011 deaths
American ballerinas